Gaocun (高村镇) is a town and the county seat of Mayang Miao Autonomous County in Hunan.

Gaocun may also refer to the following Chinese towns and townships:

Jiangxi
 Gaocun, Wanzai (高村镇), a town of Wanzai County, Jiangxi, on List of township-level divisions of Jiangxi

Henan
 Gaocun, Hebi (高村镇), a town of Qi County, Henan on List of township-level divisions of Henan
 Gaocun, Xingyang (高村乡), a township of Xingyang City, Henan
 Gaocun, Xiuwu (高村乡), a township of Xiuwu County, on List of township-level divisions of Henan
 Gaocun, Luoyang (高村乡), a township of Yiyang County, Luoyang prefecture-level city, Henan, on List of township-level divisions of Henan

Tianjin
 Gaocun, Wuqing (高村镇)